The 1892–93 season was Burslem Port Vale's first season of football in the English Football League. The club were founding members of the Football League Second Division, the First Division having been in operation for four seasons prior to 1892–93. A learning curve for the club, it marked the first of four seasons of struggle in what was rapidly becoming the second tier of the strongest league in the world. This learning curve was punctuated by the biggest league defeat in the club's history, a 10–0 humiliation in a snowstorm at home to Sheffield United on 10 December 1892, still a Football League record for a home defeat.

Other than the record defeat (which saw right-half Billy Delves play in goal), and two away performances where five goals were conceded, the Vale were competitive in most matches, winning three of their games by at least a three-goal margin. If not for the capitulation to Sheffield United then the club would have had one of the better defensive records in the league. However a run of one goal scored in five consecutive games highlighted their lack of offensive firepower. This run saw them lose eight of ten games.

Winning Football League status
Having spent their early history playing only friendly matches, cup games, and in minor leagues such as the Midland Football League; 1892–93 marked the club's first season in the English Football League. The Football League's merger with the Football Alliance saw the club granted Second Division status, due to their third place standing in the Midland League in 1891–92, along with Northwich Victoria and Sheffield United.

Overview

Second Division
The pre-season started terribly, star striker Frank McGinnes dying of kidney disease before a ball was kicked. His replacement was Wallace Bliss, and local headmaster Fred Farrington was appointed captain. The first match continued in desperately poor fashion; Billy Beats missed the train, and so Vale played with ten men against Small Heath, losing 5–1, with Bliss scoring the club's first Football League goal – his only goal in the league ever. Away matches were difficult for the "Valeites" as players had trouble gaining permission from their employers to miss work. Vale suffered a 10–0 defeat in a snowstorm at home to Sheffield United on 10 December, a Football League record for a home defeat.

Finishing in 11th place, they finished one place above bottom club Walsall Town Swifts, and level on points with Crewe Alexandra. Their fifteen points were less than half the tally of champions Small Heath (who were not promoted after losing their 'Test Match'). A time of expansion for the competition, they retained their league status despite their poor showing (disbanded Bootle were the only team to lose their status), and the next season three more teams were added to the league. Vale's defence performed admirably (most of the time), however Vale only scored 30 goals in their 22 league games. Their first ever point came at Bootle, and their first ever win was a 4–1 home victory over Crewe Alexandra.

Cup competitions
Despite reaching the Fifth Round of the FA Cup in 1885–86, they failed to make it through the qualifying stages this time round. In the Staffordshire Senior Cup they exited in the First Round to Burton Wanderers, and in the Birmingham Senior Cup they left at the Second Round after a 4–1 defeat by Aston Villa.

League table

Results

Burslem Port Vale's score comes first

Football League Second Division

Results by matchday

Matches

FA Cup

Birmingham Senior Cup

Staffordshire Senior Cup

Player statistics

Appearances

Top scorers

Transfers

Transfers in

Transfers out

References
Specific

General

Port Vale F.C. seasons
Burslem Port Vale